Ákos Szarka (born 24 November 1990) is a Slovak football forward who plays for Hungarian club Ajka. Ákos was a former member of the Slovakia national under-21 football team.

Personal life
Szarka hails from the Hungarian minority in Slovakia, and thus qualifies for the Felvidék national football team.

Club statistics

Updated to games played as of 2 June 2018.

References

External links
 
 FC DAC 1904 Dunajská Streda official club profile 

1990 births
People from Dunajská Streda District
Sportspeople from the Trnava Region
Hungarians in Slovakia
Living people
Slovak footballers
Association football forwards
FC Petržalka players
ŠK Slovan Bratislava players
ŠK Senec players
FC DAC 1904 Dunajská Streda players
Diósgyőri VTK players
Gyirmót FC Győr players
Suwon FC players
Kaposvári Rákóczi FC players
FC Ajka players
Slovak Super Liga players
Nemzeti Bajnokság I players
Nemzeti Bajnokság II players
K League 2 players
Slovak expatriate footballers
Expatriate footballers in Hungary
Slovak expatriate sportspeople in Hungary
Expatriate footballers in South Korea
Slovak expatriate sportspeople in South Korea